Prestonsburg is a small home rule-class city in and the county seat of Floyd County, Kentucky, United States. It is in the eastern part of the state in the valley of the Big Sandy River.   The population was 3,255 at the time of the 2010 census, down from 3,612 at the 2000 census.

History
The area was part of the  grant in the early 1700s to the family of John Preston's wife, born Elizabeth Patton, which he administered on her behalf. The grant was intended to permit British colonization beyond the Blue Ridge Mountains, but subsequent French and Indian resistance and a reversal of British policy limited its impact. The land was not settled until John Spurlock of Montgomery County, Virginia, arrived in 1791. He laid out the town of "Preston's Station" in 1797. It became the seat of Floyd County upon its formation in 1799 and was formally established in 1818. The post office was known as "Floyd Court House" from its establishment in 1816 until the late 1820s, when it was renamed "Prestonsburg".

On January 10, 1862, nearby Middle Creek was the scene of the largest battle of the Civil War to occur in eastern Kentucky.  The town was also the site of one of the worst school bus disasters in American history on February 28, 1958.

The town had a pack horse library in the late 1930s to bring library materials to rural mountain residents.

Culture

U.S. Route 23, also called "The Country Music Highway" to celebrate the region's rich heritage of music, runs through Prestonsburg. Country music stars including Loretta Lynn, Crystal Gayle, Wynonna Judd, Naomi Judd, Billy Ray Cyrus, Tom T. Hall, Ricky Skaggs, Keith Whitley, Dwight Yoakam, and Patty Loveless are all from the Big Sandy Valley. Heavy metal singer and guitarist Dave Reffett also grew up near this area.

Prestonsburg is mentioned in Dwight Yoakam's "Readin', Rightin', Rt. 23" (from his album Hillbilly Deluxe), a song about the yearning of local coal miners to escape their plight by traveling up U.S. Route 23 to find employment in the factories in the North, not knowing that they were only trading one miserable life for another.

Prestonsburg is the location of the Mountain Arts Center, which hosts music concerts and is home to the Kentucky Opry. Middle Creek National Battlefield is the site of the largest and most significant Civil War battle in Eastern Kentucky.

Prestonsburg is home to the Samuel May House Living History Museum. It is the oldest known brick home remaining in the Big Sandy Valley. Built by Samuel May in 1817, the house was utilized by the Confederate forces as a recruiting station during the American Civil War. The 5th Kentucky Infantry CSA and 10th Kentucky Cavalry was organized at this location. The house was being used as a residence until 1981 and was donated to the City of Prestonsburg in 1992. The Samuel May House has since been restored and maintained as a living history museum.

The Jenny Wiley Theatre is located in Prestonsburg and offers theatrical productions all year long at both the outdoor Jenny Wiley Amphitheater, located within the Jenny Wiley State Resort Park, and the nearby Mountain Arts Center. The Theatre's presentations of classic Broadway musicals, comedies, historical dramas and holiday productions have kept theatre-goers entertained for the past 40 years.

Prestonsburg is also the home of the East Kentucky Science Center.  Opened in 2004, the Science Center contains one of the most technologically advanced planetariums in the United States.

Geography
Prestonsburg is located in northern Floyd County at  (37.6656527, -82.7715486) in the eastern part of the state, along the banks of the Levisa Fork of the Big Sandy River.

Climate

Demographics

As of the census of 2000, there were 3,612 people, 1,563 households, and 956 families residing in the city. The racial makeup of the city was 97.51% White, 0.33% African American, 0.50% Native American, 0.53% Asian, 0.44% from other races, and 0.69% from two or more races. Hispanic or Latino of any race were 1.02% of the population.

There were 1,563 households, out of which 26.4% had children under the age of 18 living with them, 43.4% were married couples living together, 14.5% had a female householder with no husband present, and 38.8% were non-families. 37.0% of all households were made up of individuals, and 17.0% had someone living alone who was 65 years of age or older.  The average household size was 2.09 and the average family size was 2.72.

In the city, the population was spread out, with 20.2% under the age of 18, 9.2% from 18 to 24, 26.1% from 25 to 44, 23.9% from 45 to 64, and 20.5% who were 65 years of age or older. The median age was 41 years. For every 100 females, there were 83.1 males. For every 100 females age 18 and over, there were 80.8 males.

The median income for a household in the city was $20,810, and the median income for a family was $27,852. Males had a median income of $30,809 versus $22,439 for females. The per capita income for the city was $18,013.  About 26.3% of families and 27.5% of the population were below the poverty line, including 44.2% of those under the age of 18 and 10.3% of those 65 and older.

Education
Schools are managed by Floyd County Schools.
Prestonsburg Elementary School
James D. Adams Middle School
Prestonsburg High School
Big Sandy Community & Technical College

Prestonsburg has a public library, a branch of the Floyd County Public Library.

Recreation
Archer Park
Jenny Wiley State Resort Park
Sugarcamp Mountain Trails
The Passage Trail

Notable people
Allison Ball, Kentucky State Treasurer.
Bert Combs, 50th Governor of Kentucky.
Boyd Holbrook, actor and fashion model.
Greg Stumbo, former speaker of the Kentucky House of Representatives.
Janet Stumbo, former Kentucky Supreme Court justice.

See also
Highlands Regional Medical Center
The Floyd County Times
Big Sandy Area Development District
East Kentucky Science Center

References

External links
Prestonsburg Tourism Commission

Cities in Floyd County, Kentucky
County seats in Kentucky
Populated places established in 1818
Cities in Kentucky
1818 establishments in Kentucky